Curti may refer to:
 Curti, Campania, a town in Italy
 Curti, Goa, a town in Goa, India
 Aldo Curti (footballer), an Italian footballer
 Carlo Curti, Italian-American musician, composer, conductor
 Carlo Curti (1807–1872) cellist, educator, composer at Parma, Italy
 Girolamo Curti, an Italian painter
 Merle Curti, an American historian
 Sir William Curtius FRS, English and Palatinate diplomat  (1599–1678)
 Cardinal William Curti, a 14th-century cardinal

See also
 Curtius (disambiguation)
 Kurti (disambiguation)